The Delray Beach Public Library is an independent, not-for-profit 501(c)3 library located in Delray Beach, FL in Palm Beach County, FL. The library is funded through public and private partnerships and is not a part of government.

History 
On April 11, 1913, 40 women from the Ladies Improvement Association of Delray Beach met and each donated one book to start a library in Delray Beach, FL. In 1916, the library was moved to the Booster Hall. Additionally, the Ladies Improvement Association received a ten dollar gift from Henry Flagler to support the library. In 1939, the Delray Beach Public Library officially became a not-for-profit corporation, a 501(c)3 library.

In 1940, the Delray Beach Public Library Association cultivated a public private partnership between the City of Delray Beach and the Community Redevelopment Agency (CRA). In 1950, after community fund-raising the library was moved to SE 4th Avenue with 15,000 books in circulation. In 2006, the Delray Beach Public Library was moved to its current location at 100 W. Atlantic Avenue.

Facilities 
At 46,826 square feet and two stories, the current library building is twice the size of the original. The first floor houses new materials, self-checkout machines, audiovisuals, periodicals, the circulation desk, and the children’s department. The meeting rooms, also on the first floor, seat up to 200 people. The Lynda Hunter and Virginia Kimmel children's library also features an audio recording studio and a technology lab with 3D printers.
The second floor has a computer training technology lab, 40 PCs for public use, a personal charging station, the Tower Conference Room, the Young adult room, quiet study rooms, and the Reference department. The young adult and adult non-fiction, reference, biography, and older fiction collections can be found on the second floor as well. Wi-Fi is available to the public throughout the library.

Services 
Current residents in the state of Florida can receive a free library card. The Delray Beach Public library has over 2,000 visitors per day. The Delray Beach Public Library provides free information and resources which include printed books for all ages, audio books, large print books, magazines, foreign language materials, music CDs, videos, DVDs, as well as free access to the Internet, electronic databases, proctoring services, art exhibits, concerts, a Lifelong Learning Community Institute, computer instruction, homework help, and job search assistance.

The library also offers services that cater to different age groups. It provides library story times that encourage early literacy in children and offers special after school programs and STEM classes that are centered on a child’s interests. Teenagers have the option to take advantage of the volunteer opportunities the library has to offer throughout the year where they can earn community service hours, skill enhancement, and career readiness. The Summer Leadership Academy is among the skill enhancement programs that help teens develop fundamental characteristics in leadership. The seven-week program highlights a targeted characteristic from a selected collection of books. Teens can also use Brainfuse in order to receive live tutoring and test prep information. The library supplies adults with volunteer opportunities as well, and provides opportunities for lifelong learning, community connections, and civil discourse.  The library regularly hosts special events and programs for adults, which include yoga, Socrates Café, and adult coloring club.

In addition to in person, online, email and telephone assistance, library members can also Book-A-Librarian to get one-on-one research assistance.

The Information Services Department is equipped to proctor print or online examinations, based on availability, for distance learners.

The library’s Interlibrary Loan service offers library members access to materials from other libraries if they are interested in an item the library does not own.

Collection 
The Delray Beach Public Library’s collection comprises a variety of physical and digital resources that are accessible with a library card. Any person residing in Florida can get a card from Delray Beach Library at no charge - with a photo ID or a license. New patrons under the age of 14 must register with a parent or legal guardian to obtain a card.    

The first floor of the library is home to the Lynda Hunter and Virginia Kimmel Children’s Library. Open to the public since 2016, the children’s library’s vibrant, storybook-Esque space contains a 40,000+ collection of fiction and nonfiction books. Board books for babies, picture books for primary grades, chapter books series for intermediate grades, and tween graphic novels are among the rich assortment of books for young readers and families. Children’s eBooks, audiobooks, movies, music, and comics are directly accessible with a Delray Beach library card through Hoopla, CloudLibrary, and Overdrive. 

The young adult collection for ages 13 to 17 is located on the second floor of the library. The low shelves hold the general collection of 20,000 young adult novels which are a variety of thrillers, romance, contemporary, fantasy and science fiction books. The library’s special collection of manga and graphic novels is designated in the Young Adult room, where patrons between the ages of 13 to 17 can comfortably study and utilize computers for research or leisure. Like in Children’s, young adult eBooks, audiobooks, movies, music, and comics are directly accessible with a Delray Beach library card through Hoopla, CloudLibrary, and Overdrive. 

Sharing the same floor with young adults, the books for adult readers are specifically organized by the Dewy Decimal System for nonfiction titles and the author’s last name for fiction and biography. The extensive special collection of mystery fiction has classic to the modern and in-demand titles of the year. Other popular and new book titles are also present on the first floor along with large print books. Digital collections for adults are available through Hoopla, CloudLibrary, and Overdrive. Moreover, there are 98,000+ books are available for adult readers.

Annual events 
 Laugh with the Library, an annual comedy benefit
 Delray Reads Day, an annual community-wide reading project

Awards 
 Greater Delray Beach Chamber Of Commerce - Luminary Gala Award, Non-Profit Organization of the Year 2011-2012
 Community Foundation of Palm Beach and Martin Counties-Forever Endowment Challenge (2017)

References

External links 
 Delray Beach Public Library

Public libraries in Florida
Education in Palm Beach County, Florida
Buildings and structures in Palm Beach County, Florida
Library buildings completed in 1913
1913 establishments in Florida
Delray Beach, Florida